So Fresh: The Hits of Summer 2001 is a compilation of the latest songs that were popular in Australia at the time of release. It was released in November 2000.

Track listing

CD 1
 Christina Aguilera – "Come On Over Baby (All I Want Is You)" (3:25)
 Mary Mary – "Shackles (Praise You)" (3:19)
 Samantha Mumba – "Gotta Tell You" (3:21)
 Wheatus – "Teenage Dirtbag" (4:03)
 Bomfunk MC's – "B-Boys & Flygirls" (Y2K Mix) (3:15)
 Five + Queen – "We Will Rock You" (3:09)
 Jennifer Lopez – "Let's Get Loud" (4:00)
 Modjo – "Lady (Hear Me Tonight)" (3:45)
 Destiny's Child – "Jumpin', Jumpin'" (3:49)
 A1 – "Take On Me" (3:33)
 True Steppers and Dane Bowers featuring Victoria Beckham – "Out of Your Mind" (3:26)
 Girl Thing – "Last One Standing" (3:38)
 Ronan Keating – "Life Is a Rollercoaster" (3:56)
 Mandy Moore – "I Wanna Be with You" (4:14)
 Leah Haywood – "Crazy" (3:08)
 Toni Braxton – "Spanish Guitar" (Mousse T.'s Radio Mix) (4:04)
 Nine Days – "Absolutely (Story of a Girl)" (3:15)
 Daphne and Celeste – "U.G.L.Y." (3:25)
 S Club 7 – "Two in a Million" (3:35)
 Bond – "Victory" (4:40)

CD 2
 Anastacia – "I'm Outta Love" (3:48)
 Bon Jovi – "Say It Isn't So" (3:33)
 Pink – "There You Go" (3:24)
 Naughty by Nature featuring Phiness – "Holiday" (4:08)
 Sisqó featuring Beanie Sigel – "Unleash the Dragon" (3:54)
 Chicane featuring Bryan Adams – "Don't Give Up" (3:41)
 Aneiki – "Pleased to Meet You" (3:51)
 Aqua – "Cartoon Heroes" (3:40)
 Enrique Iglesias – "Be with You" (3:40)
 Coco Lee – "Wherever You Go" (3:52)
 Lara Fabian – "I Will Love Again" (3:45)
 Jessica Simpson – "I Wanna Love You Forever" (4:25)
 Human Nature – "Be There with You" (3:53)
 Bachelor Girl – "Permission to Shine" (4:18)
 Brian McKnight – "Back at One" (3:23)
 Boyz II Men – "Pass You By" (4:04)
 98 Degrees – "I Do (Cherish You)" (3:47)
 Hanson – "If Only" (4:31)
 Blink-182 – "All the Small Things" (2:49)
 Frenzal Rhomb – "War" (2:30)

Charts

References

So Fresh albums
2000 compilation albums
2001 in Australian music